In mathematics, the local trace formula  is a local analogue of the Arthur–Selberg trace formula that describes the character of the representation of G(F) on the discrete part of L2(G(F)), for G a reductive algebraic group over a local field F.

References

Automorphic forms
Theorems in number theory